The 2023 German Figure Skating Championships were held on January 5–7, 2023 at the Eissportzentrum Oberstdorf in Oberstdorf. Skaters competed in the disciplines of men's singles and ladies' singles on the senior level and pair skating and ice dance on the senior, junior, and novice levels. Single skating competitions on the junior and novice levels were held on December 16-18, 2022 at the Eissportzentrum Oberstdorf in Oberstdorf. 

The results of the national championships were among the criteria used to choose the German teams for the 2023 Winter University Games, 2023 European Youth Olympic Winter Festival, 2023 European Championships, 2023 Junior World Championships and 2023 World Championships.

Medalists

Senior results

Men

Women

Pairs

Ice dance

Junior results

Men

Women

Pairs

Ice dance

International team selections

Winter University Games 
The 2023 Winter University Games were held in Lake Placid, United States from January 13–16, 2023. The German team was announced on December 14, 2022.

European Youth Olympic Winter Festival 
The 2023 European Youth Olympic Winter Festival was held in Friuli-Venezia Giulia, Italy from 21 to 28 January 2023. The German entries were announced on January 11, 2023.

European Championships 
The 2023 European Championships were held in Espoo, Finland from 25 to 29 January 2023. Germany's team was announced on January 7, 2023.

World Junior Championships 
Commonly referred to as "Junior Worlds", the 2023 World Junior Championships will be held in Calgary, Canada from February 27 – March 5, 2023. The list of entries was published on February 7, 2023.

World Championships 
The 2023 World Championships will be held in Saitama, Japan from March 20–26, 2023.

References

External links 
 2023 German Championships: Senio results and Junior and novice pairs and ice dance results at the German Ice Skating Union
2023 German Youth Nationals: Junior and novice singles skating results at the German Ice Skating Union

German Figure Skating Championships
German Championships
Figure Skating Championships